The Superintendent of State Prisons was an officer of the New York State government, who was in charge of the administration of the state prisons. The office was created by a constitutional amendment ratified in 1876, to succeed the three statewide elective New York State Prison Inspectors. The Superintendent was appointed to a five-year term by the Governor of New York, and confirmed by the New York Senate.

Office holders
Louis D. Pilsbury 1877 to 1882.
Isaac Volney Baker, Jr. (1843-1912) 1882 to 1887.
Austin Lathrop. 1887 to 1898
Cornelius V. Collins 1898 to 1911 
Joseph F. Scott (1860-1918) 1911 to 1913.
John B. Riley 1913 to 1916.
Frank Eugene Wade (1854-1929) 1916 to ?.
Charles F. Rattagan 1920.

Notes